Salvia glechomifolia is a herbaceous perennial native to central Mexico at elevations ranging from 7,500 to 10,500 ft. Glechomifolia means "with foliage like glechoma", which is a genus of creeping and stoloniferous plants in the mint family.

Salvia glechomifolia is a creeping perennial which makes an airy colony of yellow-green upright and sparse foliage. The leaves reflect light, grow on short stems from 1.5–2 ft, and appear to grow in widely spaced whorls. The plant flowers lightly all summer with long blue-violet flowers that have two prominent white lines leading to the nectar. The 1 in flowers grow in unevenly spaced whorls, typically with less than 12 flowers in each whorl, giving the overall effect of daintiness.

Notes

glechomifolia
Flora of Mexico